Chinookan peoples include several groups of Indigenous people of the Pacific Northwest in the United States who speak the Chinookan languages. Since at least 4000 BCE Chinookan peoples have resided along the Lower and Middle Columbia River (Wimahl) (″Great River″) from the river's gorge (near the present town of The Dalles, Oregon) downstream (west) to the river's mouth, and along adjacent portions of the coasts, from Tillamook Head of present-day Oregon in the south, north to Willapa Bay in southwest Washington. In 1805 the Lewis and Clark Expedition encountered the Chinook Tribe on the lower Columbia.

The term "Chinook" also has a wider meaning in reference to the Chinook Jargon, which is based on Chinookan languages, in part, and so the term "Chinookan" was coined by linguists to distinguish the older language from its offspring, Chinuk Wawa. There are several theories about where the name ″Chinook″ came from. Some say it is a Chehalis word Tsinúk for the inhabitants of and a particular village site on Baker Bay, or "Fish Eaters". It may also be a word meaning "strong fighters".

Some Chinookan peoples are part of several federally recognized Tribes: the Yakama Nation (primarily Wishram), the Confederated Tribes of the Warm Springs Reservation (primarily Wasco), Confederated Tribes of the Grand Ronde Community, and the Chinook Indian Nation, consisting of the Cathlamet, Clatsop, Lower Chinook, Wahkiakum, and Willapa Chinooks.

The Chinook Indian Nation, consisting of the five westernmost Tribes of Chinookan peoples, Lower Chinook, Clatsop, Willapa, Wahkiakum and Kathlamet is currently (2023) working to restore federal recognition. The Chinook Nation gained Federal Recognition on January 3, 2001 from the Department of Interior under President Bill Clinton. After President George W. Bush was elected, his political appointees reviewed the case and, in a highly unusual action, revoked the recognition.

The Chinook Nation sought Congressional support for recognition by the legislature in 2008 with a Bill Introduced by Brian Baird. The Bill died in Congress.

The unrecognized Tchinouk Indians of Oregon trace their Chinook ancestry to two Chinook women who married French Canadians traders from the Hudson's Bay Company prior to 1830. The specific Chinook band these women were from or if they were Lower or Upper Chinook could not be determined. These individuals, settled in the French Prairie region of northwestern Oregon, becoming part of the community of French-Canadians and Métis (Mix-Bloods). There is no evidence that they are a distinct Indian community within French Prairie. The Chinook Indian Nation denied that the Tchinouk had any common history with them or any organizational affiliation. On January 16, 1986, the Bureau of Indian Affairs determined that the Tchinouk Indians of Oregon do not meet the requirements necessary to be a federally recognized tribe.

The unrecognized Clatsop-Nehalem Confederate Tribes was formed in 2000. The Clatsop-Nehalem have approximately 130 members and claim to have Chinookan and Salish-speaking Tillamook (Nehalem) ancestry. This is contested by the Chinook Indian Nation. The Indian Claims Commission, Docket 234, found, in 1957, that the Clatsop Chinooks were part of the Chinook Indian Nation. The Indian Claims Commission also found in Docket 240, 1962, that the Nehalem people were part of the Confederated Tribes of Siletz Indians.

Historic culture

Practices and lifestyle 
The Chinookan peoples were relatively settled and occupied traditional tribal geographic areas, where they hunted and fished; salmon was a mainstay of their diet. The women also gathered and processed many nuts, seeds, roots and other foods. They had a society marked by social stratification, consisting of a number of distinct social castes of greater or lesser status. Upper castes included shamans, warriors, and successful traders. They composed a minority of the community population compared to common members. Members of the superior castes are said to have practiced social discrimination, limiting contact with commoners and forbidding play between the children of the different social groups.

Some Chinookan peoples practiced slavery, a practice borrowed from the northernmost tribes of the Pacific Northwest. They took slaves as captives in warfare, and used them to practice thievery on behalf of their masters. The latter refrained from such practices as unworthy of high status.

The elite of some tribes had the practice of head binding, flattening their children's forehead and top of the skull as a mark of social status. They bound the infant's head under pressure between boards when the infant was about 3 months old and continued until the child was about one year of age. This custom was a means of marking social hierarchy; flat-headed community members had a rank above those with round heads. Those with flattened skulls refused to enslave other persons who were similarly marked, thereby reinforcing the association of a round head with servility. The Chinook were known colloquially by early white explorers in the region as "Flathead Indians".

Living near the coast of the Pacific Ocean, the Chinook were skilled elk hunters and fishermen. The most popular fish was salmon. Owing partly to their settled living patterns, the Chinook and other coastal tribes had relatively little conflict over land, as they did not migrate through each other's territories and they had rich resources in the natural environment. In the manner of numerous settled tribes, the Chinook resided in longhouses. More than fifty people, related through extended kinship, often resided in one longhouse. Their longhouses were made of planks made from red cedar trees. The houses were about 20–60 feet wide and 50–150 feet long.

Language and storytelling

Franz Boas (1858-1942) 
In 1888 he published, "The Journal of American Folk-Lore" a journal discussing American Folklore, here he describes some “Chinook Songs” and offers them in both the Chinook language and English translation.

"Native Legends of Oregon and Washington Collected" collection of Chinook legends and stories written and collected by Franz Boas in 1893, it was a collection of different Chinook Folklore taken from his time spent with the Chinookan people between the years of 1890 and 1891 during his summer trips to Oregon and Washington.

Published in 1894, famed American/German anthropologist, Franz Boas, wrote the “Chinook Texts”. In this reference book Boas includes various, Myths, Beliefs, Customs, Tales, and Historical Tales, as told by the Chinookan people themselves.

George Gibbs (1815–1873) 
George Gibbs another popular anthropologist of his time, collected Alphabetical Vocabulary of the Chinook Language. He was assisted by Robert Shortess and Soloman H. Smith of Oregon and A.C. Anderson of Victoria, Vancouver Island. The many words were collected and scattered from various different tribes given the scarcity of the Chinookan people at the time. The book was mainly written for trading purposes and Gibbs collected the majority of his translation from the traders themselves.

Chinook people today

The Chinookan peoples have long had a community on the lower Columbia River. These lower Columbia Chinook tribes and bands re-organized in the 20th century, setting up an elected form of government and reviving tribal culture. They first sought recognition as a federally recognized sovereign tribe in the late 20th century, as this would provide certain treaty-promised benefits for education and welfare. The Department of Interior's Bureau of Indian Affairs rejected their application in 1997. Since the late 20th century, the Chinook Indian Nation has engaged in a continuing effort to secure formal recognition, conducting research and developing documentation to demonstrate its history. They are referred to in government and historic accounts, but treaties signed at Tansy Point in 1851 were not acted upon by Congress through a formal ratification process. This inaction caused the Chinook territories defined in the treaties to remain unceded. Nevertheless, these territories were taken by the federal government. If Congress had formally ratified the treaties, a reservation would have been established, which would have meant automatic recognition.

In 2001, the U.S. Department of Interior recognized the Chinook Indian Nation, a confederation of the Cathlamet, Clatsop, Lower Chinook, Wahkiakum and Willapa Indians, as a tribe, according to its rules established in consultation with other recognized tribes. The tribe had documented continuity of their community over time on the lower Columbia. This recognition was announced during the last months of the administration of President Bill Clinton.
Since the 1930s, individual Chinook people have had Allotments on the timber-rich Quinault Reservation in Grays Harbor County, Washington. The Quinault appealed recognition of the Chinook in August 2001, and the matter was taken up by the new administration.

After President George W. Bush was elected, his new political appointees reviewed the Chinook materials. In 2002, in a highly unusual action, they revoked the recognition of the Chinook and of two other tribes also approved by the previous administration. Efforts by Brian Baird, D-Wash. from Washington's 3rd congressional district, to gain passage of legislation in 2011 to achieve recognition of the tribe were not successful. In his decision on a lawsuit filed in late 2017, U.S. District Court Judge Ronald B. Leighton ruled recognition could only be granted from Congress and other branches of government, but largely sided with the tribe; Leighton denied seven of eight claims by the Interior Department to dismiss the case, including a challenge to a 2015 rule that bars tribes from seeking recognition again.

The Chinook Indian Nation's offices are in Bay Center, Washington. The tribe holds an Annual Winter Gathering at the plankhouse in Ridgefield, Washington. It also holds an Annual First Salmon Ceremony at Chinook Point (Fort Columbia) on the North Shore of the Columbia River. In 2019, the Chinook Indian Nation purchased ten acres of the 1851 Tansy Point treaty grounds.

List of Chinookan peoples

Chinookan-speaking groups include:
 Lower Chinook  (at the mouth of the Columbia River in modern Washington, part of the unrecognized Chinook Indian Nation)
 Kathlamet or Cathlamet (Cathlahmah) (at the mouth of the Columbia River in modern Oregon and Washington, part of the unrecognized Chinook Indian Nation)
 Clackamas or Cathlascans (″Those along the Clackamas River″, inhabited the Willamette Valley on the eastbank of the Willamette River as far as the Willamette Falls, above and below the Falls themselves on either bank, and along the Clackamas River and Sandy Rivers. Lewis and Clark estimated their population at 1800 persons in 1806. At the time the tribe lived in 11 villages and subsisted on fish and roots. By 1855, the 88 surviving members of the tribe were relocated to the Confederated Tribes of the Grand Ronde Community of Oregon)
 Clatsop (around the mouth of the Columbia River and the Clatsop Plains in northwestern Oregon, Chief Coboway welcomed Lewis and Clark; by 1840, the number of Clatsop Indians was 200, in 1850 the number was down by half; today predominantly part of the Chinook Indian Nation as one of its officially confederated tribes; some others part of Confederated Tribes of Siletz Indians, and the recently organized, unrecognized Clatsop-Nehalem Confederated Tribes)
 Clowwewalla, also (Willamette) Falls Indians or Tumwater Falls Indians (controlled the Willamette Valley, Oregon, perhaps a subgroup of the Clackamas, may have included the Cushook, Chahcowah, and Nemalquinner of Lewis and Clark, who estimated that they numbered 650 in 1805–6. On this basis Mooney (1928) estimated there might have been 900 in 1780. They were greatly reduced by the epidemic of 1829 and in 1851 numbered 13 and are now apparently extinct. Maybe some survive as Clackamas as part of the Confederated Tribes of the Grand Ronde Community of Oregon)
 Wasco-Wishram
 Wasco (known also by their Sahaptin name as Wascopam, lived traditionally on the south bank of the Columbia River, Oregon, they were divided into three subtribes: the Dalles Wasco or Wasco proper (near The Dalles in Wasco County), the Hood River Wasco (along the Hood River to its mouth into the Columbia River, sometimes divided into two bands: the Hood River Band in Oregon, and the White Salmon River Band in Washington). In 1822 their population was estimated to be 900, today 200 tribal members out of 4,000 of the Confederated Tribes of Warm Springs are estimated to be Wasco)
 Wishram (a Yakama-Sahaptin term), their autonym as Ita'xluit was the source of transliteration as Tlakluit or Echelut (Echeloot) (lived traditionally on the north bank of the Columbia River, Washington, Wishram village or Nixlúidix ("trading place") near Five Mile Rapids, was the center of the regional trade system for Pacific Coast, Plateau, Great Basin and Plains tribes, in the 1700s, the estimated Wishram population was 1,500. In 1962 only 10 Wishrams were counted on the Washington census, today they are predominantly enrolled in the Confederated Tribes and Bands of the Yakama Nation)
Chilluckittequaw or Chiluktkwa (living on the north side of Columbia River in Klickitat and Skamania counties, Washington, from about 10 miles below the Dalles to the neighborhood of the Cascades. In 1806 Lewis and Clark estimated their number at 2,400. According to Mooney a remnant of the tribe lived near the mouth of White Salmon River until 1880, when they removed to the Cascades, where a few still resided in 1895, today sometimes considered as White Salmon River Band of Washington of the Hood River Wasco subtribe)
 Watlata or Cascades Indians (lived downstream from the other Wasco groups and were divided in two groups, one on each side of the Columbia River and at the Cascades of the Columbia River and the Willamette River in Oregon; the Oregon group were called Gahlawaihih [Curtis]). The Watlala, whose dialect is the most divergent dialect of the Wasco, may have been a separate tribe though identified as Wasco since 1830, and enrolled as "Ki-gal-twal-la band of the Wasco" and the "Dog River band of the Wasco″ in Confederated Tribes of Warm Springs)
 Kilooklaniuck (extinct as a tribe)
 Multnomah or Cathlascans (living in approximately 15 villages on Sauvie Island (Wappatoo / Wapato Island) (hosting a total of 2,000 people who built and resided in cedar log houses 30 yards long by 12 yards wide), other villages were located along Multnomah Channel and in the Wapato Valley near the mouth of the Willamette (Multnomah) River into the Columbia River and generally along the western Willamette riverbank, also known as Wappato / Wapato people after Wappato/Wapato (Indian potato), an marsh-grown plant like a potato or onion and important staple food for Native peoples, today part of the Confederated Tribes of Siletz Indians, a minority are enrolled in the Confederated Tribes of the Grand Ronde Community of Oregon)
 Skilloot (occupied both sides of the Columbia River, between the Washougal River (from the Cascades Chinook placename: [wasiixwal] or [wasuxal], meaning "rushing water") and Cowlitz River; Clark mentioned one village of 25 houses, made of wooden planks with straw roofs. Altogether, the Corps estimated the Skilloot population in 1806 to be about 2,500. An 1850 population estimate put the tribe at about 200 surviving members. The Skilloot no longer exist as an independent band.)
 Wahkiakum, Wackiakum, Wac-ki-cum or Wahkiaku ("tall timber in reference to the plank houses", another source gives ″region downriver″, lived in two villages along the Elochoman River on the north bank of the Columbia River, Washington, opposite of the Kathlamet in Oregon; sometimes considered a Kathlamet village group under the leadership of Chief Wahkiakum, part of the Confederated Tribes of Siletz Indians, and of the unrecognized Chinook Indian Nation)
 Willapa Chinook (along the north bank of the Columbia River in southwestern Washington around southern Willapa Bay, from Cape Disappointment to Grays Harbor, today enrolled in the federally recognized Shoalwater Bay Tribe and the unrecognized Chinook Indian Nation)

In the 21st century, a large proportion of Chinook people live in the regions surrounding the towns of Bay Center, Chinook, and Ilwaco in southwest Washington and in Astoria, Oregon.
 
Books written about the Chinook include the novel Boston Jane: An Adventure by Jennifer L. Holm

Notable Chinook

Comcomly, chief in the early to mid-19th century
Charles Cultee, the principal informant to early 20th-century anthropologist Franz Boas on his language and tribal studies, especially for Chinook Texts.
Ranald MacDonald, mixed-race son of Archibald McDonald, a Scottish Hudson's Bay Company fur trader, and Raven, Chief Comcomly's daughter, in Astoria, Oregon, was the first Westerner to teach English in Japan, in 1847–1848. He taught Einosuke Moriyama, who served as one of the chief interpreters during negotiations between Commodore Perry and the Tokugawa Shogunate
J. Christopher Stevens, American diplomat and lawyer who served as the U.S. Ambassador to Libya from June 2012 to September 2012. He was killed when the U.S. consulate was attacked in Benghazi, Libya, on September 11, 2012
Catherine Troeh, historian, artist, activist and advocate for Native American rights and culture. An elder of the Chinook tribe, she was a direct descendant of Chief Comcomly.
Chief Tumulth, signed the 1855 treaty that created the Grand Ronde Reservation; he was later killed by Gen. Philip Sheridan's forces
Tsin-is-tum, "Princess Jennie Michel", a Native American folklorist. Called "Last of the Clatsops."

See also

Chinook salmon
Chinook (wind)
Boeing CH-47 Chinook

References

Further reading

 Chinookan Peoples of the Lower Columbia Published by University of Washington Press, 2013 - 
 Oral traditions from the Chinook, Nez Perce, Klickitat and other tribes of the Pacific Northwest.

External links

 Chinook Indian Nation, official website
 Who's Who in the Chinook tribes
 Lewis and Clark PBS

Columbia River Gorge
Native American tribes in Oregon
Native American tribes in Washington (state)
Oregon Coast
Terminated Native American tribes